Mannington is an unincorporated community and coal town in Christian County, Kentucky, United States.

References

Unincorporated communities in Kentucky
Unincorporated communities in Christian County, Kentucky
Coal towns in Kentucky